FIGJAM may refer to:

 FIGJAM (acronym), standing for "Fuck I'm Good, Just Ask Me" 
 "Figjam", a 2005 single by Australian band Butterfingers which refers to the above acronym
 FigJam, an online collaboration product developed by Figma

See also
 Common fig
 Fruit preserves